Grenz-Echo is the only German language daily newspaper published in Eupen, Belgium, aimed at the German-speaking community and the neighbouring areas in the east of the country.

History and profile
Grenz-Echo was first published in June 1927. The paper calls itself a politically independent, tolerant and Christian daily and is published six days per week. The headquarters of the paper is in Eupen. It provides both local and international news.

Grenz-Echo was banned in Germany in the 1933 due to its anti-Nazi stance. The paper was relaunched following World War II.

Its circulation in 2002 was 12,382 copies with the market share of 1.9%. The circulation of Grenz-Echo was 11,757 copies in 2008 and 11,980 copies in 2009. It was 12,104 copies in 2010 and 11,991 copies in 2011.

References

External links 
 Official site

1927 establishments in Belgium
Eupen
German-language newspapers published in Europe
Newspapers published in Belgium
Publications established in 1927